Cirphis may refer to:

 Mount Cirphis in Greece, between the Bay of Antikyra and the valley of the Pleistus
 Cirphis (Phocis), a town of ancient Phocis, Greece
 Cirphis, a genus of moths